Samuel James Beasant (born 8 April 1988) is an English footballer who plays as a goalkeeper for Chesham United.

Career
After leaving Cypriot club Olympiakos Nicosia due to contract issues, he joined the Glenn Hoddle Academy, where his father - former England goalkeeper Dave Beasant - was a coach. Following an unsuccessful trial with Birmingham City, he joined non-league Maidenhead United in November 2011.

After a successful half-season with the club, he moved onto Woking, but after just three appearances he left for Billericay Town, returning to the Kingfield Stadium ahead of the 2013/14 season.

At the end of the season, he moved up to the Football League with Stevenage. Sharing goalkeeping duties with veteran Chris Day during pre-season, he was chosen ahead of Day in their opening League Two fixture at home to Hartlepool United, keeping a clean sheet in a 1–0 victory.

In July 2015, Beasant signed a one-year deal with Cambridge United. Beasant was released by Cambridge United at the end of the 2015/16 season.

Beasant joined Braintree in the summer of 2016 after rejecting 'numerous' offers from other clubs. He played his first ever FA Cup second-round game on 4 December 2016 against Millwall.

In July 2017, Beasant joined Chelmsford City. After a one-year spell with the Clarets, Beasant made the switch to fellow National League South side Concord Rangers.

After spending the 2019–20 campaign with Hemel Hempstead Town, Beasant joined Chesham United in September 2020.

Personal life
Beasant is the son of former international footballer Dave Beasant, who also played as a goalkeeper.

Career statistics

References

External links

1988 births
Living people
People from Denham, Buckinghamshire
Footballers from Buckinghamshire
English footballers
Association football goalkeepers
Maidenhead United F.C. players
Woking F.C. players
Billericay Town F.C. players
Oxhey Jets F.C. players
Stevenage F.C. players
Cambridge United F.C. players
Braintree Town F.C. players
Chelmsford City F.C. players
Concord Rangers F.C. players
Hemel Hempstead Town F.C. players
Chesham United F.C. players
National League (English football) players
English Football League players
Southern Football League players
English expatriate footballers
English expatriate sportspeople in Spain
Expatriate footballers in Spain
English expatriate sportspeople in Cyprus
Expatriate footballers in Cyprus